Elin Hilderbrand is an American writer, mostly of romance novels. Her novels are typically set on and around Nantucket Island, where she resides. In 2019, New York Magazine called Hilderbrand "the queen of beach reads".

Biography
Hilderbrand was born and raised in Collegeville, Pennsylvania, is a graduate of Johns Hopkins University, and was previously a teaching/writing fellow at the University of Iowa Writers' Workshop.
She spent her summers on Cape Cod, "playing touch football at low tide, collecting sea glass, digging pools for hermit crabs, swimming out to the wooden raft off shore," until her father died in a plane crash when she was sixteen. She spent the next summer working, doing piecework in a factory that made Halloween costumes; she promised herself that the goal for the rest of her life would be to always have a real summer. She moved to Nantucket in July 1993, took a job as "the classified ads girl" at a local paper, and later started writing.

Her first novels were published by St. Martin's Press. With A Summer Affair, published in 2008, she moved to Little, Brown and Company. The Perfect Couple, her first murder mystery, was published in 2018.

Actress Ellen Pompeo has been working with ABC in adapting Hilderbrand's Paradise Trilogy into a TV series where she would star after her departure as the lead on Grey's Anatomy.

In 1995, Hilderbrand married Chip Cunningham at The Chanticleer in Siasconset, Massachusetts; they divorced in 2015. They have three children together. She had a double mastectomy in June 2014.

Bibliography
Novels
The Hotel Nantucket (2022)
Golden Girl (2021)
Troubles in Paradise (2020)
28 Summers (2020)
What Happens in Paradise (2020)
Summer of '69 (2019)
Winter in Paradise (2018)
The Perfect Couple (2018)
Winter Solstice (2017)
The Identicals (2017)
Winter Storms (2016)
Here's To Us (2016)
Winter Stroll  (2015)
The Rumor (2015)
Winter Street  (2014)
The Matchmaker  (2014)
Beautiful Day  (2013)
Summerland  (2012)
Silver Girl  (2011)
The Island  (2010)
The Castaways  (2009)
A Summer Affair (2008)
Barefoot (2007)
The Love Season (2006)
The Blue Bistro (2005)
Summer People (2003; 
Nantucket Nights (2002)
The Beach Club (2000)

Short Stories
The Sixth Wedding: A 28 Summers Story (2021)
Summer of '79: A Summer of '69 Story (2020)
The Tailgate: An Original Short Story  (2014)
The Surfing Lesson: An Original Short Story  (2013)

References

External links 

 

Living people
Year of birth missing (living people)
20th-century American novelists
20th-century American women writers
21st-century American novelists
21st-century American women writers
Iowa Writers' Workshop faculty
Johns Hopkins University alumni
Novelists from Iowa
Novelists from Massachusetts
Novelists from Pennsylvania
People from Collegeville, Pennsylvania
People from Nantucket, Massachusetts